Dissona is a genus of sea snails, marine gastropod mollusks in the family Ovulidae.

Species
Species within the genus Dissona include:
Dissona reflexa Cate, 1973
Dissona tarasconii Bozzetti, 2007
Dissona tosaensis (Azuma & Cate, 1971)

References

External links

Ovulidae